The Ministry of Foreign Affairs and International Cooperations is the Somali government ministry which oversees the foreign relations of Somalia. The current minister is Abshir Omar Huruse. 

The agency is responsible for formulating foreign policies, decisions, foreign affairs documents, and statements regarding the FRS. It also negotiates and signs bilateral and multilateral foreign treaties and agreements. The agency also dispatches foreign affairs representatives to other countries.

It represents Somalia's interests in United Nations conferences, inter-governmental meetings, and the activities of international organizations. MOFA advises the central government in formulating diplomatic strategies, guidelines, and policies.

Organization
Minister
Deputy Minister
Permanent Secretary
The Department of Policy Planning 
The Department of African Affairs
The Department of Asian and Pacific Affairs
The Department of Middle East and North African (MENA) Affairs 
The Department of European Affairs
The Department of Americas Affairs
The Department of International Organizations and Conferences
The Department of Legal Affairs
Section For international Law & Treaties 
The Protocol Department
The Department of Consular Affairs
Section of Diplomatic Relations 
The Administrative Department and Planning
Section of Personnel
Section of Diplomatic Institute 
Section of Planning and Coordination 
The Department of Communication 
The Department of Maritime and Ocean Affairs
Section of Climate and Environment 
Section of Aviation, Border and Institute
The Department of Economic and Trade
Section of Investment Promotion
The Department of External Security Affairs 
The Department of Finance 
Section of Asset Management 
The Bureau of Archives 
The Department of Diaspora

List of ministers

This is a list of Ministers of Foreign Affairs of Somalia:

1960–1964: Abdullahi Issa Mohamud
1964–1967: Ahmed Yusuf Dualeh
1967–1969: Muhammad Haji Ibrahim Egal
1969: Haji Farah Ali Omar
1969–1976: Umar Arteh Ghalib
1976–1977: Muhammad Siad Barre
1977–1987: Abdirahman Jama Barre
1987–1988: Muhammad Ali Hamoud
1988–1989: Muhammad Siad Barre
1989–1990: Abdirahman Jama Barre
1990: Ali Ahmed Jama Jangali
1990: Ahmed Muhammad Aden
1990-1991: Garad Abdiqani Garad Jama
1991–1992: Muhammad Ali Hamoud
2000–2002: Ismail Mahmud Hurre
2002–2004: Yusuf Hassan Ibrahim
2004–2006: Abdullahi Sheikh Ismail
2006–2007: Ismail Mahmud Hurre
2007: Hussein Elabe Fahiye
2007–2008: Muhammad Ali Hamoud
2008–2009: Ali Ahmed Jama Jangali
2009: Mohamed Abdullahi Omaar
2009–2010: Ali Ahmed Jama Jangali
2010: Yusuf Hassan Ibrahim
2010–2011: Mohamed Abdullahi Omaar
2011–2012: Mohamed Mohamud Ibrahim
2012: Abdullahi Haji Hassan Mohamed Nuur
2012–2014: Fawzia Yusuf H. Adam
2014–2015: Abdirahman Duale Beyle
2015–2017: Abdusalam H. Omer
2017–2018: Yusuf Garaad Omar
2018–2020: Ahmed Isse Awad
2020–2021: Mohamed Abdirizak Mohamud
2021–2022: Abdisaid Muse Ali
2022 – present: Abshir Omar Huruse

See also

Foreign relations of Somalia
List of diplomatic missions of Somalia
List of diplomatic missions in Somalia

References

External links
 Ministry of Foreign Affairs of the Federal Republic of Somalia

Foreign relations of Somalia
Foreign Affairs
Somalia
1960 establishments in Somalia